The cycling competition at the 1928 Summer Olympics in Amsterdam consisted of two road cycling events and four track cycling events, all for men only.  The individual event in road cycling was a time trial over a distance of 168 km; the team competition was decided by aggregating the times of the three fastest riders from each nation.  The 50 km track event held in 1920 and 1924 was replaced by a 1 km time trial.

Medal summary

Road cycling

Track cycling

Participating nations
149 cyclists from 27 nations competed.  Ireland, Spain, and Turkey competed in cycling for the first time.

Medal table

References

External links
 

 
1928 Summer Olympics events
1928
O
1928 in road cycling
1928 in track cycling